Joel Engle (born June 3, 1968) is an American author, pastor, and former Christian recording artist.  He recorded the number one song "Shadow of Your Cross" and the top 10 songs "Louder Than The Angels,"  "Be A Father To Her," and "I Believe In You."  Engle also wrote several popular worship songs including "I Bow Down" and "You Are The Holy One."

Early life 
As a young boy growing up in San Francisco, Joel Engle never knew his father. Tragedy struck when, at the age of 11, Joel found his mother lying on the kitchen floor after suffering a stroke. She died soon after, leaving Joel in the care of his elderly grandparents in Wetumka, Oklahoma. Just three years later there was even more upheaval when Joel's grandfather died and his grandmother went to live in a retirement home.  At the age of 14, Joel was placed in the Baptist Children's Home in Moore, Oklahoma. Engle was adopted by Dale and Nadine Engle of Garber, Oklahoma, at age 16.

Education
Engle went on to study music and theology on scholarship at Oklahoma Baptist University. While there, he met and eventually married his wife Valerie.

Career
After college, Engle toured with Dawson McAllister student conferences for three years, playing in front of crowds upward of 500,000 per year.

In 1997, Joel and wife Valerie, started Spin360, a modern worship resource that provided worship leaders with songs, chord charts, sheet music, and other tools.  This ministry served over 12,000 churches worldwide. Joel's piano and vocal talents were also simultaneously being put to good use with many camp dates, conferences, and outreach opportunities with the Billy Graham Association, Fellowship of Christian Athletes, and Student Life. Joel has shared the stage with GMA Dove Award winners Casting Crowns, TobyMac, Rebecca St. James, Third Day, MercyMe, and others.

Author

In 2006, Engle signed a publishing contract with LifeWay Publishing.  He released The Exchange: Tired Of Living the Christian Life On Your Own.

In 2010, Engle released The Father I Never Had through Lucid Publishing.

Awards
In 2012, Engle received the Performance In Excellence award from his alma mater Oklahoma Baptist University.

Pastoral Ministry
In 2008, Engle founded The Exchange Church, which operated in the Alliance area of far north Fort Worth, Texas until its closing in 2020. Engle transitioned from his position as pastor at The Exchange in 2012 to ChangePoint Church in Anchorage, Alaska, where he became the Pastor of Preaching and Vision.

In January 2015, Engle spoke at Liberty University's Convocation held in Vines Center.

In 2020, Engle relocated back to the contiguous United States and became lead pastor at Fusion Bible Church in Durant, Oklahoma.  Engle announced he had left his position at Fusion Bible Church in 2021.

Discography
Surrender (1999)
Nothing Left Of Me (2001)
Louder Than The Angels (2002)
Made for Worship (2005)
I Believe in You (2007)
Nothing Left of Me
Ultimate Worship Collection - 3 CDs

References

External links
 Official website
 LastFM page
 ChangePoint Church website

Pianists from San Francisco
Oklahoma Baptist University alumni
American performers of Christian music
Living people
Singers from San Francisco
1968 births
20th-century American pianists
American male pianists
21st-century American pianists
20th-century American male musicians
21st-century American male musicians
21st-century American writers